Eldred Glacier is a glacier  long, flowing to the north coast of King George Island immediately east of Potts Peak, in the South Shetland Islands. It was named by the UK Antarctic Place-Names Committee in 1960 for Andrew J. Eldred, Master of the sealing vessel Thomas Hunt from Stonington, Connecticut, who visited the South Shetland Islands in 1873–74, 1875–76, 1878–79 and 1879–80. During the latter season he took part in the unsuccessful search for the Charles Shearer.

See also
 List of glaciers in the Antarctic
 Glaciology

References 

 
 

Glaciers of King George Island (South Shetland Islands)